Animecon is the name of several different anime conventions:

 AnimeCon (Brazil) in Brazil
 Animecon (Finland) in Finland
 Animecon (Netherlands) in the Netherlands
 Animecon (Slovakia) in Slovakia
 AnimeCon in San Jose, California in 1991 (which split into Anime Expo and Anime America)
 AnimeCon Louisville in Louisville, Kentucky
 AnimeCon UK in Liverpool in 2001